Love & War is the fifth and final studio album from the Christian rock band, BarlowGirl. The album was released on September 8, 2009, on Fervent Records. "Beautiful Ending" is the first single to be released from the album.

Track listing 

Alyssa Barlow and Lauren Barlow share lead vocals in the band. The main lead singer of each song is noted below:

Charts

Albums

Singles

Awards 

In 2010, the album was nominated for a Dove Award for Rock/Contemporary Album of the Year at the 41st GMA Dove Awards.

References

External links 

 Official BarlowGirl Website
 Fervent Records

2009 albums
BarlowGirl albums
Fervent Records albums